D123 is a state road on island of Mljet in Croatia connecting the main state road on the island (D120) to Sobra ferry port, from where Jadrolinija ferries fly to the mainland, docking in Prapratno and the D416 state road.

The road, as well as all other state roads in Croatia, is managed and maintained by Hrvatske ceste, a state-owned company.

Traffic volume 

Traffic is not regularly counted on the road, however, Hrvatske ceste report number of vehicles using Prapratno-Sobra ferry line, connecting the D123 and D416 state road. Substantial variations between annual (AADT) and summer (ASDT) traffic volumes are attributed to the fact that the road connects to a number of summer resorts.

Road junctions and populated areas

Sources

State roads in Croatia
Transport in Dubrovnik-Neretva County
Mljet